Aglipay may refer to the following:

Aglipay, Quirino, a municipality in the Philippines
Gregorio Aglipay, co-founder of the Philippine Independent Church, also known as the "Aglipayan Church"